Aldair (born 1965), Aldair Nascimento dos Santos, was a Brazilian football defender

Aldair is a given name. It may also refer to:

Aldair Santos (born 1989), Santomean football midfielder
Aldair Basto (born 1990), Mexican football midfielder
Aldair Baldé (born 1992), Bissau-Guinean football winger
Aldair Quintana (born 1994), Colombian football goalkeeper
Aldair Salazar (born 1994), Peruvian football defender
Aldair Rodríguez (born 1994), Peruvian football striker
Aldair Neto (born 1994), Angolan football forward
Aldair Mengual (born 1997), Mexican football defender
Aldair (footballer, born 1996), Aldair Ribeiro de Souza, Brazilian football forward
Aldaír Ferreira (born 1998), Angolan football midfielder
Aldair Fuentes (born 1998), Peruvian football defensive midfielder
Aldair Sanchez (born 2002), American soccer defender